Johnson Twinomujuni is an Anglican bishop in Uganda: since 2017 he has served as the Bishop of West Ankole.

Twinomujuni was born in 1968 in Muko, Mbarara District. He was educated at the African Bible College in Malawi; the Reformed Theological Seminary in Jackson, Mississippi; and Uganda Christian University. He was ordained a deacon in December 1998, and a priest in December 1999.
Twinomujuni has served the church in Kibingo Parish, Ankole  Diocese, as Diocesan Missions Coordinator of Ankole Diocese, Chaplain Maryhill High school, Chaplain of St. Luke's Chapel Mbarara University of Science and Technology, and as part time lecturer of Christian Ethics, Old Testament, New Testament and Worldviews at Bishop Stuart University.

He also served as cofounder and Principal  of Uganda Bible Institute in Mbarara, Uganda. Principal He was consecrated and enthroned Bishop on 28 May 2017 at St. Peter's Cathedral, Bweranyangi, Bushenyi.

References

21st-century Anglican bishops in Uganda
Anglican bishops of West Ankole
People from Mbarara District
1968 births
Uganda Christian University alumni
Living people